Basil Coleby Roberts was an Anglican bishop in the first half of the 20th century.

Born into a clerical family — his father was Henry Eugene Roberts — he was educated at Marlborough College and Pembroke College, Cambridge.  Ordained in 1912, his first post was as  a Curate at St Jude's, Salterhebble.  He was a Lecturer at St Augustine's College, Canterbury from 1913 to 1922. He was Chaplain of Selangor from 1922 to 1927 when he became Bishop of Singapore, a post he held until 1940. The following year he became Warden of St Augustine's and an Assistant Bishop of Canterbury (both until 1955).

References

People educated at Marlborough College
Alumni of Pembroke College, Cambridge
Anglican bishops of Singapore
Singaporean religious leaders
1957 deaths
1887 births
Academics of St Augustine's College, Canterbury
Wardens of St Augustine's College, Canterbury
Anglican bishops of West Malaysia